Wiley and Jane Vann Brown House is a historic home located near Union, Hertford County, North Carolina.  It was built about 1850, and is a two-story, single-pile, three-bay, vernacular Greek Revival style timber-frame house.  It has a side-gable roof and brick exterior end chimneys.  A one-story, side-gable, frame addition built in 2005, is linked to the main block with a one-story hyphen.  Also on the property is a contributing heavy timber frame cider barn (c. 1850).

It was listed on the National Register of Historic Places in 2007.

References

Houses on the National Register of Historic Places in North Carolina
Greek Revival houses in North Carolina
Houses completed in 1850
Houses in Hertford County, North Carolina
National Register of Historic Places in Hertford County, North Carolina